The Florida Democratic Party is the affiliate of the Democratic Party in the U.S. state of Florida, headquartered in Tallahassee. Former Commissioner of Agriculture Nikki Fried is the current chair.

Andrew Jackson, the first territorial governor of Florida in 1821, co-founded the Democratic Party. After Florida achieved statehood, the party dominated state politics until the 1950s, after which Florida became a swing state through the 2010s.

Since the passage of the Affordable Care Act, Florida Democrats have prioritized advocating Medicaid expansion in the state, a policy that would provide a federally subsidized health insurance plan to approximately one million Floridians.

Following the 2022 elections, Florida is now considered a red state, with the Democrats holding neither chamber of the Florida Legislature, as well as neither of the state's U.S. Senate seats, and no statewide executive offices.

History

The Florida Democratic Party has historically dominated Florida's state and local politics. Andrew Jackson, the first territorial governor of Florida in 1821, co-founded the Democratic Party. As Florida moved from territory to statehood status, the Florida Democratic Party emerged from the locofocos. John Milton led the party, and became governor of the state, during the Civil War era.

There were no Republican governors from 1877 until 1967, when Claude R. Kirk, a Republican from Jacksonville, was sworn in as governor of Florida.

Florida politics was largely dominated by the Democrats until Richard Nixon's Southern strategy, which took advantage of objections to the advances of the Civil Rights Movement which resulted in a regional political realignment for the South. After Nixon's victory in 1968, the state voted Democratic in only four presidential elections: 1976 (Jimmy Carter), 1996 (Bill Clinton), 2008 (Barack Obama), and 2012 (Barack Obama). The presidential election in 2000 was decided by a margin of 537 votes out of approximately six million cast in the state, earning George W. Bush the presidency over Al Gore.

The Florida Senate was dominated by Democrats until 1992, when a majority of Republicans was elected. The Florida House of Representatives turned Republican after the November 1996 election. The Florida Legislature became the first legislature in any of the states of the former Confederacy to come under complete Republican control when the Republicans gained control of the House and Senate in the 1996 election.

Since the passage of the Affordable Care Act, Florida Democrats have prioritized advocating Medicaid expansion in the state, a policy that would provide a federally subsidized healthcare plan to approximately one million Floridians.

Governance
The current chairwoman of the Florida Democratic Party is former Agriculture Commissioner Nikki Fried, who succeeded former Mayor of Miami Manny Diaz Sr. on February 25, 2023.

List of chairs
Scott Maddox (2003–2005): Maddox, the former mayor of Tallahassee, Florida, served as chairman of the Florida Democratic Party from 2003 to 2006, leaving the post to run for governor. The Associated Press noted that while Democrats suffered electoral defeats during his tenure, party activists recognized he had built up the party's infrastructure and volunteer base."
Karen Thurman (2005–2010): Thurman, a former five-term member of Congress from Florida's 5th District, served from 2005 to 2010. She was elected chairman of the Florida Democratic Party in 2005, succeeding Scott Maddox, who resigned in order to seek the Democratic nomination for governor. Thurman resigned on November 12, 2010, following the midterm elections.
Rod Smith (2010–2013): In November 2010, Smith was elected chairman of the Florida Democratic Party, succeeding Karen Thurman who resigned on November 12, 2010, following the midterm elections. Smith, a former Alachua County state prosecutor and state senator from the 14th district, became chair following his unsuccessful bid for lieutenant governor in 2010. Smith's term expired in January 2013, when he was succeeded by Allison Tant.
Allison Tant (2014–2016): In December 2013, former lobbyist, philanthropist, and Democratic fundraiser Allison Tant announced she would seek the chairmanship of the Florida Democratic Party. She was elected in January 2014, after a closely contested race against Hillsborough state committeeman Alan Clendenin. After large national losses in 2014, Debbie Wasserman Schultz commissioned the Victory Task Force to "take a deep dive" to figure out what went wrong in 2014. Similarly, Chair Tant created the state-level LEAD Task Force, to learn the lessons of the statewide Democratic defeat.
Stephen Bittel (2016–2017): Bittel, who founded Terranova in 1980, is still an active Democrat in the state. He was chosen primarily for his fundraising ability after the 2016 election, but many critics noted his ability to curry influence with his immense wealth. In November 2017, he was accused of inappropriate office behavior, and subsequently left his role.
Terrie Rizzo (2017–2021): In December 2017, Rizzo was elected to replace Stephen Bittel, defeating Stacey Patel in an 830–291 vote. During Rizzo's term as chair and as a consequence of the COVID-19 pandemic, the party focused on developing web products and established a department for social media marketing.
Manny Diaz (2021–2023), In January 2021, Diaz was elected with 54% from party leaders to replace Terrie Rizzo. Diaz was elected partly to bring outreach from the Cuban-American community, which was a voting bloc that helped Donald Trump win the state in the 2020 presidential election. Diaz resigned after the 2022 midterms, which saw landslide victories and legislative supermajorities for Republicans in Florida.
Nikki Fried (2023–present), On February 25, 2023, Fried was elected with 52% of the vote to fill the chair's vacancy after Diaz's resignation, defeating former state senator Annette Taddeo, Broward County Democratic Party chair Rick Hoye, and activist Carolina Ampudia. Fried was elected after a primary defeat in the 2022 Florida gubernatorial election the previous year.

House leaders
 Mark S. Pafford (2014–2016)
 Janet Cruz (2016–2018)
 Kionne McGhee (2018–2020)
 Bobby DuBose (2020–2022)
 Evan Jenne (2022–present)

Organization
The State Executive Committee of the Florida Democratic Party is organized into six standing committees. Standing committees include: the Rules Committee, the Judicial Council, the Diversity and Inclusion Committee, the Committee on Clubs, Organizations, and Caucuses, the Legislative Liaison Committee, and the Campaign Committee.

Platform

The Florida Democratic Party has adopted a platform that covers a wide range of topics and issues under the following headings:
Access to Healthcare
An Economy That Works for Everyone
Quality Education
Protecting our Environment
Immigration Reform
Preventing Gun Violence 
Civil Rights
Government Accountability
Protecting Voting Rights
Women and Families

Current elected officials
The following is a list of Democratic statewide, federal, and legislative officeholders as of October 23, 2018:

Members of Congress

U.S. Senate
None

Both of Florida's U.S. Senate seats have been held by Republicans since 2019. Bill Nelson was the last Democrat to represent Florida in the U.S. Senate. First elected in 2000, Nelson lost his bid for a fourth term in 2018 to Republican governor Rick Scott.

U.S. House of Representatives
Out of the 28 seats Florida is apportioned in the U.S. House of Representatives, 8 are held by Democrats:

State

Statewide officials
None

State legislative leaders
Senate Minority Leader: Lauren Book
House Minority Leader: Evan Jenne

State Senate
Democrats hold a 16-seat minority in the 40-member Florida Senate:
SD-03: Loranne Ausley
SD-06: Audrey Gibson
SD-11: Randolph Bracy
SD-13: Linda Stewart 
SD-15: Victor Torres 
SD-18: Janet Cruz
SD-19: Darryl Rouson 
SD-29: Tina Polsky 
SD-30: Bobby Powell 
SD-31: Lori Berman 
SD-32: Lauren Book (Minority Leader)
SD-33: Rosalind Osgood 
SD-34: Gary Farmer
SD-35: Shevrin Jones
SD-38: Jason Pizzo 
SD-40: Annette Taddeo

State House
Democrats hold a 47-seat minority in the 120-seat Florida House of Representatives:
HD-08: Ramon Alexander
HD-09: Allison Tant
HD-13: Tracie Davis
HD-14: Angie Nixon
HD-20: Yvonne Hayes Hinson
HD-30: Joy Goff-Marcil
HD-43: Kristen Arrington
HD-44: Geraldine Thompson
HD-45: Kamia Brown
HD-46: Travaris McCurdy
HD-47: Anna Eskamani
HD-48: Daisy Morales
HD-49: Carlos Guillermo Smith
HD-59: Andrew Learned
HD-61: Dianne Hart
HD-62: Susan Valdes
HD-63: Fentrice Driskell
HD-68: Ben Diamond
HD-70: Michele Rayner
HD-81: Kelly Skidmore
HD-86: Matt Willhite
HD-87: David Silvers
HD-88: Jervonte Edmonds
HD-90: Joseph Casello
HD-91: Emily Slosberg
HD-92: Patricia Hawkins-Williams
HD-95: Anika Omphroy
HD-96: Christine Hunschofsky
HD-97: Dan Daley
HD-98: Michael Gottlieb
HD-99: Evan Jenne (Minority Leader)
HD-100: Joe Geller
HD-101: Marie Woodson
HD-102: Felicia Robinson
HD-104: Robin Bartleman
HD-107: Christopher Benjamin
HD-108: Dotie Joseph
HD-109: James Bush III
HD-112: Nicholas Duran
HD-113: Michael Grieco
HD-117: Kevin Chambliss

Mayoral offices
Some of the state's major cities have Democratic mayors. As of 2019, Democrats control the mayor's offices in five of Florida's ten largest cities: 
Tampa (3): Jane Castor
Orlando (4): Buddy Dyer
St. Petersburg (5): Ken Welch
Tallahassee (7): John Dailey
Fort Lauderdale (9): Dean Trantalis

Former Florida governors and U.S. senators

Governors

United States senators

See also

Democratic Black Caucus of Florida
Democratic Party (United States) organizations
Political party strength in Florida
Political party strength in the United States

References

External links
Florida Democratic Party
Florida College Democrats
Democratic Women's Club of Florida
Democratic Caribbean Caucus of Florida
Democratic Black Caucus of Florida

 
Democratic Party (United States) by state
Politics of Florida
Political parties in Florida
1834 establishments in Florida Territory
Political parties established in 1834